Mustapha Essaïd (born 20 January 1970 in El Ksiba) is a retired Moroccan-born French runner who specialized in the 5000 metres and cross-country running.
In 1998, Essaïd set a national outdoor record of 7.30.78 of 3 000 m event in Monaco. This is the still standing national record. He competed in the men's 5000 metres at the 2000 Summer Olympics.

References

External links
 
 Mustapha Essaid at FFA 

1970 births
Living people
French male long-distance runners
Athletes (track and field) at the 2000 Summer Olympics
Olympic athletes of France
French sportspeople of Moroccan descent